Joan Croft Halt railway station was a small halt on the East Coast Main Line (ECML) situated by a level crossing at Joan Croft Junction in South Yorkshire, England. The junction gives access from the ECML to the Skellow line of the West Riding and Grimsby Railway and eventually to Hull, Immingham and Grimsby Docks.

History

The halt consisted of two flanking platforms to the south of the level crossing, with brick-built station buildings on the York-bound(Down)side. These buildings still stand in private use. The station was set in the countryside, with just a few cottages situated either side at some distance.

The station was not shown in railway timetables as it was only for the use of platelayers and crossing keepers (and their families) to enable them to get into, and out of, Doncaster for weekend shopping.

The station opened  and closed in the 1950s.

In May 2011, Network Rail applied to the Infrastructure Planning Commission for permission to construct a North Doncaster chord to link two lines, the Askern line and the Skellow line, with a viaduct passing above Joan Croft junction. The aim of the project was to eliminate the need to use the ECML for slow-moving, westbound bulk freight trains from the Humber ports, in particular, coal from Immingham to Ferrybridge power station. As part of the proposed works, the Joan Croft level crossing was closed and replaced by a road bridge. Closing the level crossing allowed engineers to lower the overhead wires on the ECML (because the wires no longer had to be higher than the highest road vehicle plus a safety margin), thus allowing the new railway viaduct to be constructed at a lower level. The new  chord opened to traffic on 1 June 2014.

References

 

Disused railway stations in Doncaster
Rail junctions in England
Railway stations in Great Britain opened in 1920
Former North Eastern Railway (UK) stations